The Solent-class lifeboat is a steel-hulled version of the  Oakley-class self-righting lifeboat and is sometimes referred to as the 48-foot, 6-inch Oakley-class Mark III. Solent Operational Numbers followed on from the first three 48-foot, 6-inch Oakleys and were interrupted by the last two Oakleys (48-12 and 48-13). The operational numbers of the Solent-class had three digits in the suffix to indicate a metal hull (as with Clyde, Waveney, Thames and Tyne classes, one Arun class and the first eleven Merseys). Two digits indicates a wooden, glass-reinforced plastic or fiber-reinforced composite hull.

Description 
There were twin spade rudders installed which were coupled to Mathway manual steering gear.

Apart from the steel hull, the Solent-class differed from the Oakley-class in its self-righting mechanism. The Oakley used a water ballast system, while the Solent class was self-righting as a result of its watertight superstructure. The Solent was the last class of traditional displacement-type lifeboats designed by the Royal National Lifeboat Institution. 

There were two versions of the Solent, unofficially known as "Mark I" and "Mark II". The "Mark I" boats have a vertical steering wheel. Sliding doors provide access to the forward end of the wheelhouse on each side. The "Mark II" boats have a seated steering position with hinged wheelhouse doors at the after end of the wheelhouse. These boats entered service in 1972. 

The first four Solent-class boats (ON 1007-1010) and the last three (ON 1019-1021) were built at Cowes by Groves & Guttridge. The second four (ON 1011-1014) were built at Gosport by Camper & Nicholson.

Fleet

References 

Royal National Lifeboat Institution lifeboats